KM Racing Team was created in 2008 by connection of Martin Macik's Truck Team and Pavel Kubicek's motorcycle team. Martin Macík was a pilot of truck Liaz participating in the Dakar Rally since 2003 and as one team called KM Racing linked since Dakar moved to South America in 2009. During the four South American Races the team used trucks Liaz with pilots Macík Martin, Ladislav Fajtl, Vlastimil Vildman and Jaroslav Valtr, motorcyclists David Pabiska, Randysek Dusan and Ivan Jakes and quad riders Josef Machacek and Martin Plechaty.

KM Racing is the most successful Czech team of all past years in South American Dakar Rally, when, in 2009, the victory in the quads category (his fifth overall) Josef Machacek (last non-Argentinian winner in this category), and in 2004 the fourth place of Martin Macík, Czech best result in the truck category.

In Dakar 2013 km Racing had a competitive motorcycle (David Pabiška), two race trucks (Jaroslav Valtr and Vlastimil Vildman), two assistance trucks (MAN 6x6 and Liaz 4x4), Assistance car (Toyota Hilux) and press car (Toyota Hilux) where was sitting the leading photographer Petr Lusk. Its garage has other racing vehicles  such as Jeep CJ7, quads from the garage of five-time Dakar winner Josef Machacek, Buggies and Yamaha motorcycles.

Team 

 Martin Macík (coowner & founder of the team) - MAN 6x6 Assistance
 Martin Pabiška (coowner & founder of the team) - Toyota Hilux Assistance
 Pavel Kubíček (coowner & founder of the team)

Pilots 
 Jaroslav Valtr (CZE) - LIAZ Race 1
 Vlastimil Vildman (CZE) - LIAZ Race 2
 David Pabiška (CZE) - Yamaha WR 450F Dakar Kit
 Josef Macháček (CZE) - Buggy

Navigators 
 Josef Kalina (CZE) - LIAZ Race 1
 Martin Macík ml. (CZE) - LIAZ Race 2

Mechanics 
 Jakub First (CZE) - LIAZ Race 1
 Michal Mrkva (CZE) - LIAZ Race 2
 Jiří Čáp (CZE) - LIAZ 4X4 Assistance
 Jiří Čáp ml. (CZE) - LIAZ 4X4 Assistance
 Petr Čedík (CZE) - LIAZ 4X4 Assistance
 Petr Mandovec (CZE) - LIAZ 4X4 Assistance
 Milan Vyskočil (CZE) - LIAZ 4X4 Assistance
 Martin Malát (CZE) - Toyota Hilux Assistance

Documentarists 
 Petr Lusk (CZE) - photograph - Toyota Hilux novinář
 Zdeněk Sopůšek (CZE) - video - Toyota Hilux novinář
 Milan Novotný (CZE) - article
 Jiří Vintr (CZE) - article

Vehicles

Race Vehicles

LIAZ Race 1 
The current modification of the Liaz truck is a result of a ten-year continuous development by the team around Martin Macik. The team holds two almost identical race specials, which differ only in the number of turbochargers used. Liaz Race Truck 1 was driven by Jaroslav Valtr at Dakar 2013 and its engine is charged with one turbocharger. The truck was primarily built in 2011 and at its construction certain components from the trucks that Martin Macik and Vlastimil Vildman drove in 2009-2011 were used. Most importantly, the truck received a new chassis frame set with an increased rigidity and integrated tow eyes at the front and rear. New leaf springs with a different suspension characteristics were supplied and, as a new thing, shock absorbers made by FRT are mounted.

Another modification with the aim of handling improvement are different cross torque stabilizers fixed above the chassis frame with a rod on one side and an additional shock absorber on the other one. All chassis accessories are completely re-arranged with the aim of optimum weight distribution – the fuel tank is mounted in the rear and the air tanks are also re-arranged.

The look of the truck is different due to a new, custom-built superstructure, which is fixed on the front structure of the safety arc and the rear structure. The roof construction is made of steel tubes and covered by a fabric, whereas the panels are made of tin and openable upwards. The mounting of spare wheels is totally different at the rear of the truck in a perpendicular position. Their position creates more ease for the race crew when a wheel replacement is necessary.

For Silk Way Rally 2013, the truck will be powered by CAT C13 six-cylinder, modified by Gyrtech Extreme Power set and prepared by Buggyra International Racing System.

 Engine: Deutz TCD 2015, displacement 15,874 cc.; charged by 1 Holset turbocharger
 Maximum Power Output: 611 kW (830 HP) at 2200 rpm
 Maximum Speed: 150 km/h
 Gear Set: 16-valve gearbox ZF 16S2720 with a manual shift, Steyr transfer box
 Average Fuel Consumption: 50 liters / 100 km
 Fuel Tank: 900 liters
 Race Weight: 9000 kg
 Chassis: ladder frame Liaz, Rába axles fixed on Weweler leaf springs with mounting rods

For Silk Way 2013:

 Engine: Caterpillar C13 – Gyrtech Extreme Diesel Power
 Maximum Power Output: 713 kW (970 HP)
 Maximum Torque Power: 4000 Nm

LIAZ Race 2 
 The current modification of the Liaz truck is a result of a ten-year continuous development by the team around Martin Macik. The team holds two almost identical race specials, which differ only in the number of turbochargers used. Liaz Race Truck 2 was driven by Vlastimil Vildman at Dakar 2013 and by Jozef Cabala at Dakar 2012 and its engine is charged with two KKK Garret turbochargers. The truck was primarily built in 2011 completely new. Most importantly, the truck received a new chassis frame set with an increased rigidity and integrated tow eyes at the front and rear. New leaf springs with a different suspension characteristics were supplied and, as a new thing, shock absorbers made by FRT are mounted. Another modification with the aim of handling improvement are different cross torque stabilizers fixed above the chassis frame with a rod on one side and an additional shock absorber on the other one. All chassis accessories are completely re-arranged with the aim of optimum weight distribution – the fuel tank is mounted in the rear and the air tanks are also re-arranged.

The look of the truck is different due to a new, custom-built superstructure, which is fixed on the front structure of the safety arc and the rear structure. The roof construction is made of steel tubes and covered by a fabric, whereas the panels are made of tin and openable upwards. The mounting of spare wheels is totally different at the rear of the truck in a perpendicular position. Their position creates more ease for the race crew when a wheel replacement is necessary.

 Engine: Deutz TCD 2015, displacement 15,874 cc.; charged by 2 KKK-Garrett turbochargers
 Maximum Power Output: 622 kW (845 HP) at 2200 rpm
 Maximum Speed: 150 km/h
 Gear Set: 16-valve gearbox ZF 16S2720 with a manual shift, Steyr transfer box
 Average Fuel Consumption: 50 liters / 100 km
 Fuel Tank: 900 liters
 Race Weight: 9000 kg
 Chassis: ladder frame Liaz, Rába axles fixed on Weweler leaf springs with mounting rods

Jeep CJ7 Legend 
 The Legend is built by the T1 FIA homologation and it is the fourth evolution of a car originally built in 1996. The car was used in 2012 as a training vehicle for Jaroslav Valtr for Cross-country and baja races. In 2013, Jaroslav Valtr and Josef Kalina took part in Baja Italia (29th place).

The Legend has a fibre bodywork fixed on a tubular frame and all placed on a Nissan Patrol chassis frame. The Audi six-cylinder engine is driven by the Magnetti-Marelli chipset and through a sequential gearbox of 6 valves it drives the vehicle to the maximum speed of 163 km/h.

Two spare wheels are placed in the rear of the vehicle, underneath the main engine radiator and the gearbox fluid cooler. Between the spare wheels, a box with accessories is placed. The fuel tanks takes 130 liters of diesel and lasts for 280 kilometers of racing. The weight balance is 50/50, including the crew.

 Engine: Audi, 3 000 ccm
 Maximum Power Output: 225 kW (305 HP) @ 3500 rpm
 Maximum Speed: 163 km/h
 Fuel Tank: 130 l
 Weight: 2150 kg

Quad KTM

Quad Yamaha

Moto Yamaha 
 KM Racing holds four YAMAHA WR450F motorbikes – two modified for cross-country rallies and two for enduro races. The cross-country version is derived from the enduro, adding a special cross country kit, which includes the handlebar set with navigation devices and an extended wind shield and mainly additional fuel tanks – two front ones per 10 liters and one under the seat with 15 liters. The rear tank is used first during the ride. The tires, as always, are equipped with moose fillings, which are replaced at every bivouac to ensure the best possible handling of the bike in the next stage. The motorbike for David Pabiska is powered by a carburetor-equipped engine of the 2009 version, whereas the current Yamaha version already used a direct fuel injection.

 Engine Displacement: 450 ccm
 Number of Cylinders: 1
 Cooling: fluid
 Fuel-Tank Capacity: 35 liters
 Fuel Consumption: road only 2-3 liters per 100 km; off-road up to 10 liters / 100 km
 Race Weight: 135 kg
 Maximum Speed: 145–150 km/h

Assistance Vehicles

MAN 6x6 
 KM Racing has presented this modern assistance truck since 2011. The truck was homologated as a cross-country assistance vehicle by the manufacturer from the very beginning. Its main characteristics correspond to its primary purpose, for example the cab is equipped with a massive inner safety rollcage. The power train of the vehicle is a totally production one, with an all-wheel drive. The key part of the vehicle is the superstructure with a space for a heavy load, structure of drawer boxes and a workdesk. Even the power unit and the welding device took place in the superstructure. Another trunk space is located in the boxes underneath the floor. The roof carries a storage of spare truck tires, three of them can be fitted also on the rear wall of the superstructure. The truck is used in a set with a two-axle trailer for the transport of one racing truck – whether for the sake of the transport to the port or to move a vehicle that is already out of the race.

KM Racing is using the truck as a "Big-Boss vehicle" and it is mostly driven by Martin Macik himself.

 Engine: MAN D2620, displacement 12,500 cc.; turbocharged by 1 turbocharger
 Power Output: 353 kW (480 HP)
 Maximum Speed: 125 km/h
 Average Fuel Consumption: 43 liters / 100 km
 Vehicle Full Weight: 26,000 kg

LIAZ 4x4 
 The assistance Liaz truck used to be the main assistance vehicle until the purchase of the big MAN 6x6 in 2011. The Liaz has made a hard service so far over all the years. The truck was built in 2003 in Mnichovo Hradiste and it was the last production Liaz truck ever made. After that, the 50-year production of the company closed down.

The truck is based on the tradition Liaz Dakar design, which made id well maneuverable even at times when the Dakar was still organized in Africa. The power unit is the Liaz M1.2 engine, which was the racing engine at Martin Macik's early racing years, therefore the truck is quite fast. However, the main part is carried in the custom-built superstructure, with the upper "garden" for the storage of spare tires and an organization of storages inside.

At races like the Dakar, the truck is usually driven by long-time team members, Ladislav Fajtl or Jiří Čáp.

 Engine: Liaz M1.2, displacement 11,946 cc., 1 turbocharger
 Power Output: 405 kW (550 HP)
 Maximum Speed: 138 km/h
 Average Fuel Consumption: 30 liters / 100 km
 Full Weight: 18,000 kg

Toyota Hilux 
KM Racing holds two Toyota Hilux cars, of which one is used as an assistance vehicle and one as a press car. Bothe cars are powered by a stronger 3-litre Toyota turbodiesel, and equipped by an inner rollcage, stronger suspension and different damping.

The assistance car is usually the first car in the assistance convoy, heading to the next bivouac, to set grounds for the riders who are the first to finish special stages. It contains a four-door cab and in the trunk space there are boxes carrying the most basic spare parts but also  a service tent for the bikes.

The press car carries a small superstructure. Thanks to the homologated rollcage, it can run the special stages ahead of the race as all specials close down for entries one hour before the start of the first motorcycle. Today, in South America, basically every car can be a press car but only vehicles with a homologated rollcage are admitted on track. This feature is one of the main advantages for KM racing, as the photographer, Petr Lusk, can reach exclusive photo spots well ahead.

 Engine: Toyota, displacement 3000 cc., turbo diesel
 Power Output: 130 kW (180 HP)
 Maximum Speed: 180 km/h
 Average Fuel Consumption: 13 liters / 100 km
 Fuel Tank: 140 liters
 Full Weight: 2800 kg

History

Season 2010 - Today 

Dakar 2013

Truck Category
 18. place - Vlastimil Vildman, Martin Macík, Jan Bervic
 withdrawn - Jaroslav Valtr, Josef Kalina, Jakub First

Category MOTO
 39. místo - David "Bojka" Pabiška

Dakar 2012

Truck Category
 12. place - Jaroslav Valtr, David Pabiška, Jan Bervic
 withdrawn - Josef Cabala, Josef Kalina, Jakub First

Silk Way 2011

Truck Category
 13. place - Jaroslav Valtr, Martin Macík ml., Martin Macík
 17. place - Josef Cabala, Josef Kalina, Jan Bervic

Dakar 2011

Truck Category
 14. place - Vlastimil Vildman, Ladislav Fajtl, Jan Bervic

Category QUAD
 3. place - Lukasz Laskawiec

Category MOTO
 31. place - David Pabiška

Dakar 2010

Truck Category
 4. place - Martin Macík, Josef Kalina, Jan Bervic  - stále nejlepší český úspěch na Rally Dakar v Jižní Americe

Category MOTO
 31. place - David Pabiška

Sezóna 2003 - 2009 

Silk Way 2009

Truck Category
 7. place - Martin Macík, Martin Macík ml., Josef Kalina

Dakar 2009

Category QUAD
 1. place - Josef Macháček

Category MOTO
 65. place - David Pabiška

Dakar 2008

 ZÁVOD ZRUŠEN

Dakar 2007

Truck Category
 withdrawn - Martin Macík, Josef Kalina

Dakar 2006

Truck Category
 11. place - Martin Macík, Ladislav Fajtl

Dakar 2005

Truck Category
 withdrawn - Martin Macík, Ladislav Fajtl, Marek Spáčil

Dakar 2004

Truck Category
 withdrawn - Martin Macík, Jiří Žák, Ladislav Fajtl

Dakar 2003

Truck Category
 12. place - Martin Macík, Jiří Žák, Ladislav Fajtl

Motorcycle racing teams
Motorcycle racing teams established in 2008
2008 establishments in the Czech Republic
Motorcycle racing teams disestablished in 2013